Ballymena Cricket Club is a cricket club in Ballymena, County Antrim, Northern Ireland, playing in Section 1 of the NCU Senior League.

Honours
 NCU Senior League: 1
 1998
 NCU Junior Cup: ‡4
 1906, 1935, 1939, †1984
 Lagan Valley Steels T20 Trophy
 2021

‡ 1 won by 2nd XI
† Won by 2nd XI

References

External links
 Ballymena Cricket Club

Cricket clubs in County Antrim
NCU Senior League members
Ballymena
Cricket clubs in Northern Ireland